WQZL (101.1 FM), also known as "The River", is a radio station licensed to serve Belhaven, North Carolina. It has a format of variety hits as "92.3 & 101.1 The River". The station's antenna is in Washington, but the signal reaches New Bern, Greenville, and Washington, North Carolina.

History
WKJA-FM signed on June 1, 1981, at 92.1 FM. The original Effective Radiated Power was 3000 watts.

WKJA-FM was originally licensed to Roach Communications, Robert Ray "Bob" Roach, President. The original format was light CHR, but Adult Contemporary and Country formats also took occasional turns throughout the 1980s.  The station was sold to Winfas in 1984, whose other holdings at the time included WRCM/WJNC in Jacksonville, NC and WAMV/WCNV in Amherst, Virginia.

WKJA used to play oldies in the early 1990s, and then rebroadcast the signal of adult standards WANG-FM (now WHAR). In 1999, it took the WANJ calls to reflect its association with WANG-FM. In 2002, WANJ began simulcasting with WQSL, taking the WQZL calls; both stations first had a rhythmic CHR under the moniker of "The Beat of Carolina", this was later tweaked to a more Rhythmic AC format but still with the "Beat" moniker. They later flipped formats to "The Touch FM", an Urban adult contemporary format. In August 2010, WQZL severed ties with WQSL after 8 years and began simulcasting sister Rocker WXQR, giving it coverage in the inland sections of the Greenville-New Bern-Jacksonville area (WXQR serves mostly the coastal regions). On January 2, 2012, WQZL flipped to variety hits using the "S.A.M.: Simply About Music" format and calling itself "101.1 SAM FM"; "S.A.M." was previously heard on WSSM. This was the first time since the 1990s WQZL had not simulcast with another station. After 19 months, the station would flip back to a simulcast with WQSL on August 29, 2013 as 92.3/101.1 Jack FM. The simulcast started at 12 noon with a stunt as a 1960s-based oldies format as Oldies 92 before introducing Jack at 12 Noon the next day. WQZL had no air personalities since it was a Jack FM outlet, and most Jack FM branded stations do not have any personalities.

On December 16, 2013, WQZL changed their format to a country simulcast with WQSL, branded as "The Wolf".

In September 2017, Dick Broadcasting announced the purchase of Alpha Media stations in three markets — 18 stations and two translators in total, at a purchase price of $19.5 million. The acquisition of WQZL by Dick Broadcasting was consummated on December 20, 2017.

On July 6, 2018 at 5 pm, WQZL (and simulcaster WQSL) changed their format from country to variety hits, branded as "92.3 & 101.1 The River".

References

External links
NextMedia website

QZL
Adult hits radio stations in the United States